The Moment of Eclipse is a 1970 collection of science fiction short stories written by Brian Aldiss between 1965 and 1970. It was originally published by Faber & Faber. In 1972, the collection, in its entirety, received the first BSFA Award for short fiction published in 1970-71.

Contents
 Poem at a Lunar Eclipse (poem by Thomas Hardy)
 The Moment of Eclipse (1969) 
 The Day We Embarked for Cythera . . . (1970)
 Orgy of the Living and the Dying (1970) 
 Super-Toys Last All Summer Long (1969) 
 The Village Swindler (1968) 
 Down the Up Escalation (1967) 
 That Uncomfortable Pause Between Life and Art . . . (1969) 
 Confluence (1967) 
 Heresies of the Huge God (1966) 
 The Circulation of the Blood . . . (1966)
 . . . And the Stagnation of the Heart (1968)
 The Worm That Flies (1968) 
 Working in the Spaceship Yards (1969) 
 Swastika! (1968)  
 Acknowledgements (1969)

References
Notes

Bibliography

External links
The Moment of Eclipse on Brian Aldiss's official site

Science fiction short story collections
1970 short story collections
Faber and Faber books
British short story collections